Zaremba is a Polish coat of arms. It was used by several szlachta (noble) families in the times of the Polish–Lithuanian Commonwealth.

History
The first historical record of the Zaremba coat of arms appears on the shield of Thomas II Zaremba, prince-bishop of Nysa, in 1270 CE. In the 12th century, the Zaremba clan itself founded the town and endowed the church of Tuliszkow. Tuliszkow would become the seat of the Zaremba clan and in 1450, Mikolaj Zaremba, castellan of Leczyca, built the St. Vitus church, which still stands today.

The Zaremba coat of arms is mentioned by Romain Gary in his novel Promise at dawn.

Blazon
Per fess or and gules, embattled. In chief a demi lion rampant issuant sable, langued gules. In base three golden bricks 2 and 1 garnished or. For a crest: out of a ducal coronet a lion as in the arms.

Notable bearers

Thomas II Zaremba, Prince–Bishop of Nysa, 13th century

Marcin of Sławsko, Lord High Steward of Kalisz, 14th century

Andrzej Zaremba, Bishop of Poznań, 14th century

Jan Suchorzewski, nobleman, politician, and soldier (ca. 1740–1804)

Józef Zaremba, Polish military commander and general of the 18th century.

References

External links 
  Zaremba Coat of Arms & the bearers.

See also
 Polish heraldry
 Heraldry
 Coat of arms

Zaremba

ru:Заремба (дворянство)